Legacy of the Dark Lands is the eleventh studio album by German power metal band Blind Guardian, released on 8 November 2019 through Nuclear Blast. It marks a departure from all previous works, as the only instruments performed are those of the Prague Philharmonic Orchestra, with singer Hansi Kürsch being the only member of the band to perform on the album; due to this, the album is credited to the "Blind Guardian Twilight Orchestra" instead of Blind Guardian.

A project worked on by Kürsch and André Olbrich since 1996, it is a concept album set in the 17th century during the Thirty Years' War, and based on the character of Solomon Kane created by Robert E. Howard in 1928; in Legacy of the Dark Lands, Kane's daughter, Aenlin, is looking for her father's legacy in the Habsburg Empire. A tie-in prequel novel, titled The Dark Lands and written by Markus Heitz, was published on 1 March 2019. Due to the limited performing line-up, this is Blind Guardian's first album without guitarist Marcus Siepen, and the first album without drummer Frederik Ehmke since 2002's A Night at the Opera; it is also the first album on which Olbrich doesn't perform guitars, although he was still involved as songwriter and producer.

Production 

Hansi Kürsch and André Olbrich first conceived the idea for an orchestral album in 1996, when Blind Guardian started to use orchestrations as part of their music. Kürsch stated: "When we started working on it we never would have guessed that we would be working on it for such a long time. We started out rather innocently and very unaware of what to expect – and suddenly, the project turned into this huge monster." Olbrich stated: "When I got stuck during writing a Blind Guardian record, I would simply work on the orchestra project, and it cleared my mind fairly quickly. A lot of things we learned for this album were used on the last Blind Guardian records. A song like "And Then There Was Silence", for example, would never have been possible without this project."

Due to the challenge of singing with an orchestra instead of with the band's line-up, Kürsch recorded three versions of each song on the album, going from his traditional singing in Blind Guardian to a more classical approach; he also tried different lyrics each time, to find "which words would sound best" with which version.

The Prague Philharmonic Orchestra performed the instruments on the album. Actors Norman Eshley and Douglas Fielding provided narration on the album, the second time they did so on a Blind Guardian album after 1998's Nightfall in Middle-Earth; Legacy of the Dark Lands was a posthumous release for Fielding, who died on 29 June 2019.

German author Markus Heitz, who helped develop the story for the album, also wrote a tie-in prequel dark fantasy novel titled ''The Dark Lands (Die Dunklen Lande), released on 1 March 2019. Although the printed version was only made available in German, an e-book version in English was made available the following October. The novel, set in 1629 during the Thirty Years' War, follows a character named Aenlin Kane, who travels to Hamburg with her Persian friend Tahmina in search of the heritage of her father, Solomon Kane. The two are hired by the Danish West India Company, and their group, led by a man named Nicolas, must face demons trying to use the conflict for their advantage.

Track listing

Personnel
 Hansi Kürsch – vocals, production
 Prague Philharmonic Orchestra – orchestra
 Norman Eshley – narration
 Douglas Fielding – narration
 André Olbrich – production
 Charlie Bauerfeind – production, mixing

Charts

References

2019 albums
Blind Guardian albums
Nuclear Blast albums
Albums produced by Charlie Bauerfeind
Concept albums